The O Brook is a short tributary of the West Dart River on Dartmoor in Devon, England. It lies near the village of Hexworthy, and the lower part of the stream forms the boundary between the parishes of Holne and Dartmoor Forest (formerly Lydford). An earlier form of the name was Ocbroke, and it may mean "Oak Brook", although oaks are rare in the area.

The area around the stream is notable for its historic tin mines.

A rock formation on the stream bank, known as the Dragon's Den, gave rise to the legend of the Dragon of the O Brook.

References 

Rivers of Devon
Dartmoor
1O